Peter Riley Huntsman (born March 13, 1963, Los Angeles, California) is an American business executive, currently serving as the chairman of the board, president, and CEO of Huntsman Corporation. His father, Jon Huntsman Sr., founded the Huntsman Corporation and his brother, Jon Huntsman Jr., is a former United States ambassador and former governor of Utah.

Career
Huntsman is chairman of the board, president, and chief executive officer of Huntsman Corporation and sits on the litigation committee. He has served in various capacities with the Huntsman Corporation since 1983. Prior to his appointment in January 2018 as chairman of the board, Huntsman has served as president and CEO since July 2000 and had previously served as president and chief operating officer since 1994. In 1987, he joined Huntsman Polypropylene Corporation as vice president before serving as senior vice president and general manager. He has also served as president of Olympus Oil, as senior vice president of Huntsman Chemical Corporation, and as a senior vice president of Huntsman Packaging Corporation, a former subsidiary of Huntsman Corp. He is also chairman of the board of directors of Venator Materials, a publicly traded subsidiary. Additionally he is a director or manager, as applicable, of Huntsman International and certain of other subsidiaries.

Huntsman has served on numerous boards, including for Memorial Hermann Health System beginning in 2015. He has also served Board of Overseers for the Wharton School of Business and the Boards of Advisors for Interfaith of The Woodlands. In 2015, Huntsman was also named CEO of both the Huntsman Foundation and the Huntsman Cancer Foundation, two philanthropic groups established by the family.

Huntsman was named as a "Who's Who in Energy" honoree by the Houston Business Journal in 2015.

Personal life
Huntsman is married to Brynn Ballard, daughter of M. Russell Ballard, an apostle in the Church of Jesus Christ of Latter-day Saints. They have eight children.

References

Living people
American chief executives of manufacturing companies
1963 births
Huntsman family